Lachlan Bramble (born 19 April 1998) is a professional Australian rules footballer with the Hawthorn Football Club in the Australian Football League (AFL).

Early career

Bramble joined the Williamstown Football Club after failing to get drafted from the Calder Cannons. After playing 11 games and kicking 4 goals for the VFL Seagulls in 2017 and 2018, he returned to his home club Sunbury in 2019 and played in the Ballarat Football League. In 2020 he returned to Williamstown but the Covid pandemic meant that football was cancelled for the year. He opted to go to Box Hill for the 2021 pre-season, where he impressed  recruiters and was selected in the pre-season supplemental selection period.

AFL career

Bramble debuted for Hawthorn in round 14 of the 2021 AFL season against Essendon at UTAS Stadium. 

Bramble had an interrupted 2022 when he suffered a foot fracture during the pre-season.

Statistics
Updated to the end of the 2022 season.

|-
| 2021 ||  || 16
| 10 || 1 || 3 || 119 || 64 || 183 || 44 || 20 || 0.1 || 0.3 || 11.9 || 6.4 || 18.3 || 4.4 || 2.0 || 0
|-
| 2022 ||  || 16
| 9 || 0 || 3 || 87 || 51 || 138 || 25 || 21 || 0.0 || 0.3 || 9.7 || 5.7 || 15.3 || 2.8 || 2.3 || 0
|- class="sortbottom"
! colspan=3| Career
! 19 !! 1 !! 6 !! 206 !! 115 !! 321 !! 69 !! 41 !! 0.1 !! 0.3 !! 10.8 !! 6.1 !! 16.9 !! 3.6 !! 2.2 !! 0
|}

References

External links

Living people
1998 births
Calder Cannons players
Hawthorn Football Club players
Box Hill Football Club players
Williamstown Football Club players
Australian rules footballers from Victoria (Australia)